Euthymios Tornikes or Tornikios was a Byzantine ecclesiastical official and writer.

Euthymios was the son of the logothetes tou dromou Demetrios Tornikios, and a member of the Tornikios family, of princely Armenian or Georgian origin that entered Byzantine service in the mid-10th century. He is first mentioned as a deacon in 1181, and died in the Despotate of Epirus sometime after 1222. He is best known for his rhetorical speeches, of which those preserved date chiefly to the period 1200–05, such as his panegyric on the failure of the coup of John Komnenos the Fat, or monodies on the death of his father and of his close friend and relative, the metropolitan bishop of Neopatras Euthymios Malakes. According to Alexander Kazhdan, his "rhetorical works are very conventional", with only the monody on the death of his father displaying a personal tone, "describing both family characteristics and, tenderly, Demetrios's death".

References

Sources 
 

12th-century births
13th-century deaths
12th-century Byzantine people
Rhetoricians
Euthymios
People of the Despotate of Epirus
13th-century Byzantine writers